Hao Peng (born 25 December 2001) is a Chinese footballer currently playing as a midfielder for Tai'an Tiankuan, on loan from Shanghai Port.

Career statistics

Club
.

References

2001 births
Living people
Footballers from Shanghai
Chinese footballers
China youth international footballers
Association football midfielders
Shanghai Port F.C. players
21st-century Chinese people